November 8 - Eastern Orthodox liturgical calendar - November 10

All fixed commemorations below celebrated on November 22 by Orthodox Churches on the Old Calendar.

For November 9th, Orthodox Churches on the Old Calendar commemorate the Saints listed on October 27.

Saints
 Martyrs Onesiphorus and Porphyrius of Ephesus (284-305)
 Venerable Matrona of Perge, Abbess of Constantinople (492)
 Martyr Alexander of Thessalonica (c. 305)
 Martyrs Narses and Artemon, by the sword.  (see also: December 9 )
 Martyrs Christopher and Maura, by the sword.
 The Four Crowned Martyrs: 
 Claudius, Castor, Sempronian, and Nicostratus, of Pannonia (c. 306) (see also: November 8 - West)
 Venerable Helladius, monk.
 Venerable John the Short of Egypt (John Kolobos, John the Dwarf) (c. 407)
 Martyr Anthony of Apamea (5th century)
 Venerables Eustolia (610) and Sosipatra (625), of Constantinople.
 Venerable Theoctiste of Lesbos, of the Monastery Panagia "Ekatontapyliani" (Hundred Doors) in Paros (881)
 Venerable Symeon Metaphrastes ('the Translator') of Constantinople (960)
 Venerable Saints Euthymius (990) and Neophytus (c. 1118), founders of Docheiariou, Mt. Athos.

Pre-Schism Western saints
 Saint Agrippinus of Naples (Arpinus), Bishop of Naples (2nd or 3rd century)
 Saint Ursinus of Bourges, first Bishop of Bourges in France (3rd century)
 Saint Benignus of Armagh (Benen), Bishop of Armagh (468)
 Saint Pabo, founder of the monastery later called Llanbabo, in Anglesey, Wales (c. 510)
 Saint Vitonus (Vanne, Vaune), Bishop of Verdun (c. 525)

Post-Schism Orthodox saints
 Venerable Onesiphorus the Confessor, of the Kiev Caves (1148)
 Saint Nektarios (Kephalas) of Aegina, Metropolitan of Pentapolis and Wonderworker of Aegina (1920)

New martyrs and confessors
 New Hieromartyr Parthenius (Bryansky), Bishop of Ananyevsk (1937)
 New Hieromartyr Alexis (Zadvornov), Hieromonk of the Afanasiev Convent, Yaroslavl (1937)
 New Hieromartyrs Constantine Cherepanov, Demetrius Rusinov, Nestor Panin, Theodore Chichkanov, Constantine Nemeshaev, Victor Klimov, Elias Rylko and Paul Ansimov, Priests (1937)
 New Hieromartyr Joseph Schensnovich, Deacon (1937)

Other commemorations
 Icon of the Most Holy Theotokos "She Who Is Quick to Hear" (Gorgoepēkoos) of Docheiariou, Mt. Athos  (10th century)
 Repose of Righteous Eldress Matrona of Penza (1937)

Icon gallery

Notes

References

Sources
 November 9/November 22. Orthodox Calendar (PRAVOSLAVIE.RU).
 November 22 / November 9. HOLY TRINITY RUSSIAN ORTHODOX CHURCH (A parish of the Patriarchate of Moscow).
 November 9. OCA - The Lives of the Saints.
 The Autonomous Orthodox Metropolia of Western Europe and the Americas (ROCOR). St. Hilarion Calendar of Saints for the year of our Lord 2004. St. Hilarion Press (Austin, TX). p. 84.
 The Ninth Day of the Month of November. Orthodoxy in China.
 November 9. Latin Saints of the Orthodox Patriarchate of Rome.
 The Roman Martyrology. Transl. by the Archbishop of Baltimore. Last Edition, According to the Copy Printed at Rome in 1914. Revised Edition, with the Imprimatur of His Eminence Cardinal Gibbons. Baltimore: John Murphy Company, 1916. pp. 345–346.
 Rev. Richard Stanton. A Menology of England and Wales, or, Brief Memorials of the Ancient British and English Saints Arranged According to the Calendar, Together with the Martyrs of the 16th and 17th Centuries. London: Burns & Oates, 1892. pp. 531–532.
Greek Sources
 Great Synaxaristes:  9 ΝΟΕΜΒΡΙΟΥ. ΜΕΓΑΣ ΣΥΝΑΞΑΡΙΣΤΗΣ.
  Συναξαριστής. 9 Νοεμβρίου. ECCLESIA.GR. (H ΕΚΚΛΗΣΙΑ ΤΗΣ ΕΛΛΑΔΟΣ).
  09/11/2016. Ορθόδοξος Συναξαριστής. 
Russian Sources
  22 ноября (9 ноября). Православная Энциклопедия под редакцией Патриарха Московского и всея Руси Кирилла (электронная версия). (Orthodox Encyclopedia - Pravenc.ru).
  9 ноября по старому стилю  /  22 ноября по новому стилю. Русская Православная Церковь - Православный церковный календарь на 2016 год.

November in the Eastern Orthodox calendar